Aralosaurini is a proposed tribe of hadrosaurid dinosaurs belonging to the subfamily Lambeosaurinae. The members of this group lived in Asia and Europe during the end of the Late Cretaceous about 83.6 to 66.0 million years ago. The clade may not be monophyletic, with Canardia and Aralosaurus potentially instead being unrelated primitive members of the subfamily.

Description
The Aralosaurini are distinguished by their maxilla whose anterior part is elevated dorsally. More precisely, the rostrodorsal region of the bone widens to form a prominent subrectangular flange, which rises vertically above the rostroventral process.
 
Aralosaurus was previously reconstituted with a nasal boss similar to that of Gryposaurus and classified as a member of Hadrosaurinae. A new study of the incomplete skull of the animal showed that the fragmentary nasal was in fact a portion of a hollow structure that communicated with the respiratory system. Which is a typical lambeosaurine feature. Given the fragmentary nature of the nasal, the size and shape of the hollow structure of Aralosaurus are still unknown, but it was located far in front of the orbits, which is a primitive position in lambeosaurine. In Canardia, the too fragmentary state of the skull does not say anything about the presence of a crest.

Phylogeny

This clade was found by the study first naming it to contain only Aralosaurus from the Late Santonian-Early Campanian of Kazakhstan and Canardia from the Late Maastrichtian of France.

The following cladogram was produced by Xing Hai and his colleagues in 2022 and shows the phylogeny of Lambeosaurinae. Aralosaurus and its close relative Canardia are included in the tribe of Aralosaurini, which are identified as the most basal members of Lambeosaurinae.

Other recent phylogenetic analyses have failed to recover Canardia and Aralosaurus forming a monophyletic clade.

Palaeoecology
The Aralosaurini appear to have preferred coastal wetland habitats. Aralosaurus lived on the west coast of the Asian continent bordering the Turgai Sea, while Canardia lived on the west coast of the Ibero-Armorican island bordering the Atlantic Gulf.

References

Lambeosaurines